Jack Sack (February 22, 1902 – March 7, 1980; born Jacob Bernard Sacklowsky) was an American football player and coach. Sack was a college football player at the University of Pittsburgh and coach, and played professional football in both the National Football League (NFL) and the American Football League (AFL).

Early life
Sack was born in Pittsburgh, Pennsylvania, was of Russian-Polish extraction, and was Jewish. He attended Fifth Avenue High School in Pittsburgh.

College career
After playing in high school in Pittsburgh, Sack attended the University of Pittsburgh where he played for the 1920 until 1922. Sack was named Walter Camp All-America honorable mention and New York Times All-East honorable mention. He was selected by Dr. L. H. Baker as a member of Pittsburgh's All-Time Team.

Professional football career

Columbus Tigers
Sack made his professional debut in the NFL in 1923 with the Columbus Tigers. He played for the Tigers for one year.

Canton Bulldogs
In 1926, Sack signed on with the Canton Bulldogs of the NFL, where he played under future Hall of Fame coach Pete Henry.

Cleveland Panthers
Sack also played in the American Football League with the Cleveland Panthers. While playing for the Panthers, he was also signed on with the Canton Bulldogs.

Coaching career
Sack was the 12th head football coach at Geneva College in Beaver Falls, Pennsylvania, serving for one season, in 1924, and compiling a record of 3–4–2.

Later life
Sack eventually became the owner of Pittsburgh Office Furniture and Equipment in Pittsburgh. He died on March 7, 1980, following a long illness.

Honors
Sack was inducted into the Jewish Sports Hall of Fame of Western Pennsylvania in 1992.

Head coaching record

References

External links
 

1902 births
1980 deaths
American football guards
American football tackles
Canton Bulldogs players
Cleveland Panthers players
Columbus Tigers players
Geneva Golden Tornadoes football coaches
Pittsburgh Panthers football players
Sportspeople from Pittsburgh
Coaches of American football from Pennsylvania
Players of American football from Pittsburgh
Jewish American sportspeople
20th-century American Jews